

Result of municipal elections
Results of the 1959 municipal elections.

References

Local elections in Norway
1950s elections in Norway
Norway
1959 in Norway